YKB may refer to:

 Yoni Ki Baat
 Yapı ve Kredi Bankası, Turkish bank